The 1985 IIHF European U18 Championship was the eighteenth playing of the IIHF European Junior Championships.

Group A
Played April 1–7, 1985, in Anglet France.  For the first time, a nation other than the USSR, Czechoslovakia, Sweden, and Finland, finished in the top four.  Norway defeated Finland three to two, and then hung on to tie the Germans five to five, earning them second in group 1 and an opportunity to play for their first medal.  It would take another ten years for another nation to break through the four team monopoly, with the Germans placing 2nd in 1995.

First round
Group 1

Group 2

Final round 
Championship round

Placing round

France was relegated to Group B for 1986.

Tournament Awards
Top Scorer  Sami Wahlsten (13 points)
Top Goalie: Artūrs Irbe
Top Defenceman:Rudolf Záruba
Top Forward: Ulf Dahlén

Group B
Played March 24–30, 1985, in Sofia Bulgaria

First round 
Group 1

Group 2

Final round 

Championship round

Placing round

Romania was promoted to Group A and Hungary was relegated to Group C, for 1986.

Group C
Played in Brixen Italy, from March 19–24, 1985.

Italy was promoted to Group B for 1986.

References

Complete results

Junior
IIHF European Junior Championship tournament
International ice hockey competitions hosted by France
IIHF European U18 Championship
Junior
International ice hockey competitions hosted by Bulgaria
Sports competitions in Sofia
1980s in Sofia
Junior
Junior
International ice hockey competitions hosted by Italy